"Willow" (stylized in all lowercase) is a song by American singer-songwriter Taylor Swift, released on December 11, 2020, through Republic Records. It is the opening track of her ninth studio album, Evermore (2020), serving as its lead single. "Willow" is a chamber folk love song making use of several metaphors to convey the singer's romantic state of mind, such as portraying her life as a willow tree, over picked guitars, glockenspiel, flute, strings, and percussion.

Swift penned the song's lyrics upon hearing an instrumental composition by the song's producer Aaron Dessner. She compared the song's overarching motif to casting a love spell. An accompanying music video, directed by Swift, premiered the same day as the song's release. The video is a continuation of the storyline from her preceding video for "Cardigan" (2020), showing a golden thread that guides the singer through a mystical saga and leads her to her fated lover. It received widespread critical acclaim from music critics and audiences alike, with particular praise for its romantic lyricism and guitar-centric sound.

"Willow" debuted atop the Billboard Hot 100, scoring Swift her seventh number-one song in the United States, third number-one debut, and second chart-topper in 2020 after "Cardigan"; simultaneously, Evermore opened at number-one on the Billboard 200, making Swift the first act in history to debut atop both the charts in the same week on two occasions, following Folklore and "Cardigan". "Willow" further topped Billboard Hot Alternative Songs, Hot Rock & Alternative Songs, Digital Song Sales, and Adult Pop Songs charts. The song also reached number one in Australia, Canada, and Singapore, and the top 10 in Belgium, Croatia, Hungary, Ireland, Malaysia, New Zealand, and the United Kingdom. Swift performed "Willow" live for the first time at the 63rd Annual Grammy Awards, which was described by Rolling Stone as one of the greatest Grammy performances of all time. The music video of "Willow" earned three nominations at the 2021 MTV Video Music Awards.

Background and release
American singer-songwriter Taylor Swift launched her eighth studio album, Folklore, in July 2020. After its release, the album's co-producer Aaron Dessner casually composed an instrumental track "Westerly", named after the location of Swift's Rhode Island home. An hour later, Swift wrote "Willow" to the track and sent him back the finished song. "Willow" was a surprise release made available on December 11, 2020, alongside Swift's second surprise album, Evermore, as its lead single. The song was written by Swift and Dessner, who also produced the track. Dessner programmed the track and played drums, percussion, keyboards, synthesizers, piano, and electric, bass, and acoustic guitars. The orchestration was provided by Bryce Dessner. Greg Calbi and Steve Fallone mastered the track at Sterling Sound, Edgewater, New Jersey, while Jonathan Low mixed it at Long Pond Studios in Hudson Valley, New York.

On December 13, 2020, Swift's 31st birthday, an electronic "Dancing Witch" version of "Willow" was released, remixed by Swedish producer Elvira. It was followed by an acoustic "Lonely Witch" version on December 14, and a synth-driven "Moonlit Witch" version on December 15. A video for the "Lonely Witch" version, featuring behind-the-scenes pictures from the "Willow" music video, and a video for the "Dancing Witch" version, featuring the storyboards of the "Willow" music video, were uploaded to Swift's YouTube channel on December 15, 2020. "Willow (90's trend remix)", an electronic remix of the song, was released as part of the Evermore fan edition, which was available for digital download on June 3, 2021. The remix was later independently released onto digital download and streaming services on June 14.

Composition 

"Willow" is a chamber folk ballad with Americana stylings, indie folk orchestration, tropical house accents, and a hip hop-leaning rhythm reminiscent of Swift's 2017 album, Reputation. It is built around a glockenspiel, drum machines, cello, French horn, electric guitars, violin, flute, and orchestrations, and is characterized by its "breathless" chorus.

The song is mostly set in  common time with  bars in the chorus. It has a tempo of 84 beats per minute. It is written in the key of E minor and Swift's vocals span from E3 to B5. Constructed in verse–chorus form, it follows the chord progression Em–D–Em–D–Em–D–C. Lyrically, "Willow" is a love song that sees Swift invite her soulmate into her life, making use of several metaphors. Its chorus consists of lyrics such as "Wherever you stray, I follow" and "I'm begging for you to take my hand", which reference Swift's older lyrics: "nothing safe is worth the drive / And I will follow you, follow you home" in "Treacherous" (2012), and "you take my hand and drag me head first" in "Fearless" (2008), respectively.

Critical reception
Patrick Ryan of USA Today named "Willow" as a lyrical standout on Evermore. In his album review for The New York Times, Jon Pareles complimented the song's "restlessly intertwined guitar picking" as one of Evermore numerous musical flourishes. Paste critic Ellen Johnson commended the song as a "graceful opener" to Evermore, while Bobby Olivier of Spin called it an earworm suited for beach bonfires. Writing for The Guardian, Alexis Petridis opined that "Willow" could easily function as a "pop banger" if synthesizers, auto-tune and programmed beats replaced its "tasteful" acoustic arrangement. Varietys Chris Willman wrote that the song represents Swift's state of mind, and deemed it a cousin to "Invisible String" and "Peace", the eleventh and fifteenth tracks on Folklore (2020), respectively. Insider writers Courteney Larocca and Callie Ahlgrim lauded "Willow"; Ahlgrim admired the song's chorus and lyrics that can easily convey "deeply tangled" human emotions, while Larocca thought that the song resumes Swift's "dreamland" trope from "The Lakes" (2020), the final track on Folklore. Rolling Stone named "Willow" one of 2020's best pop collaborations, praising the pairing between Swift and producer Dessner.

Commercial performance 
Debuting at number one on the Billboard Hot 100, "Willow" scored Swift her seventh number-one single in the US. It made her the first artist in history to debut an album and a single at number one simultaneously on two occasions, previously achieving it with Folklore and "Cardigan" (2020). "Willow" was Swift's third number-one debut on the Hot 100, after "Shake It Off" (2014) and "Cardigan". The song became Swift's 29th top-10 hit on the Hot 100, surpassing Mariah Carey and Stevie Wonder as the artist with the sixth most top-10 entries in the chart's history, and extended her female record for the most debuts in the top-10, with 19. "Willow" collected 30 million streams, 12.3 million radio impressions, and 59,000 digital sales in its first week. On the chart dated January 2, 2021, it descended to number 38 on the Hot 100 and marked the biggest fall from the number-one spot of the chart. In its third week on the Hot 100 (dated January 9, 2021), "Willow" climbed up 15 spots to number 23. It spent 20 total weeks on the chart.

"Willow" also debuted atop the Billboard Digital Songs chart, furthering her record for the most number-one tracks on the chart, with 21. The song also topped the Billboard Hot Rock & Alternative Songs chart, followed by 13 other Evermore tracks, giving Swift her second number-one song on the chart after "Cardigan". On the Billboard Hot Alternative Songs chart, Swift claimed 16 spots led by "Willow", besting Machine Gun Kelly's 12 simultaneous entries. Additionally, the song topped Billboard Alternative Streaming Songs and Alternative Digital Song Sales. Four months after its release, "Willow" topped the Billboard Adult Top 40 airplay chart dated April 21, 2021. It marked Swift's eighth number-one single on the chart and her first since "Delicate" (2018), tying her with Katy Perry for the third-most leaders on the chart. It spent three weeks atop it.

In Canada, "Willow" arrived at number one on the Canadian Hot 100, generating Swift's seventh number-one hit in the country. On the UK Singles Chart, "Willow" arrived at number three, shifting 35,183 units in its opening week; it was blocked from the top spot by two Christmas songs. The song marked Swift's eleventh top-five hit in the country. "Willow", along with fellow Evermore tracks "Champagne Problems" (number 15) and "No Body, No Crime" (number 19), increased Swift's total top-20 entries in the country to 21. Similarly, "Willow" landed at number three on Irish Singles Chart, alongside tracks "Champagne Problems" and "No Body, No Crime" at numbers six and 11, respectively, increasing Swift's total amount of Irish top-50 hits to 38.

In Australia, Swift achieved a "Chart Double" by topping both albums and singles charts at the same time. "Willow" opened atop the ARIA Singles Chart, garnering the singer her seventh Australian number-one hit, and the second in 2020 following "Cardigan". In New Zealand, "Willow" debuted at number three on the Top 40 Singles chart, with Evermore tracks "Champagne Problems", "No Body, No Crime" and "Gold Rush" landing at numbers 24, 29 and 34, respectively. On Billboard Global 200 and Global Excl. U.S. charts, "Willow" peaked at numbers two and five, respectively.

Music video 
An accompanying music video for "Willow", directed by Swift, was released along with the song. It is Swift's third self-directed video, following "The Man" and "Cardigan". The video describes the experience of yearning for someone and life's twists along the way to finding the right person. On December 15, 2020, a behind-the-scenes video and a "Before and After" video, featuring the original video footage side by side with their corresponding digital storyboard shots, illustrated by Vincent Lucido, were released.

Synopsis and analysis 
The "Willow" music video is a continuation of the "Cardigan" video, picking up where the former left off. Swift, drenched from her oceanic voyage, sits covered by a warm glow of her rustic cabin. A golden string in her hands (referencing the Folklore track "Invisible String") leads her to an alternate reality inside the back of her magical piano that helps her to traverse time and space. Swift has used the color gold to represent her boyfriend, Joe Alwyn, throughout her albums Reputation (2017), Lover (2019) and Folklore. The piano opens into a rabbit hole under the roots of a willow tree in an autumnal forest, on the other side. Swift emerges from the willow, embarking on a mystical journey guided by the magical thread. She sees a reflection of herself with a man (Korean-American dancer Taeok Lee) in a moonlit pool.

The string later leads her to a scene from her childhood (a reference to "Seven"), where the child versions of Swift and Lee are seen playing together with the string, suggesting that the pair is destined to be together. Swift exits the tent and finds her adult self at a carnival tent party, where she performs with a golden mist-emitting lute inside a glass box (a metaphor from "Mirrorball"), dressed in a cream-colored Zimmerman gown and a bridal headpiece by Jennifer Behr (a "Love Story" reference). While Swift finds Lee, she is trapped inside the glass box, which Swift described before the video's premiere as a metaphor for her feelings about fame. She then realizes that the only way out is to follow the magical thread through the rabbit hole under floor of the glass box, a scene that may represent Swift reaching her lowest moments before finding a golden path once more. During this scene, Swift looks into the camera directly, while mouthing the lyrics "I come back stronger than a '90s trend", a nod to 1989, which is her first pop album.

The scene shifts to a wintry forest, where Swift emerges hooded in a cloak reminiscent of her video for "...Ready for It?" (2017). She is joined by other hooded dancers who gather in a circle to perform a ceremony around a bonfire that oozes lots of golden mist and magical orbs. Swift has referenced witchcraft in previous songs such as "...Ready For It?", "I Did Something Bad" (2017), and "Mad Woman" (2020). While dancing, she finds the golden string once again and follows it, leading her back to her cottage. Lee pulls off his mask and looks at the departing Swift in despair. Swift exits the piano wearing a new gown, representing the journey back to her roots as a changed person due to her experiences in the outside world.

At the end of the string, Swift finds out that she is not alone in the cottage and that the string has guided her to back to her lover, Lee, while the lyrics "every bait-and-switch was a work of art" play. The scene sees Swift appreciate the obstacles in her life that led to their relationship. The hook that she repeats throughout the song—"I'm begging for you to take my hand / Wreck my plans, that's my man"—finally comes true at the video's end. The couple walks out the door, holding hands, into a forest shrouded in golden sunlight. This climax references "Daylight", the final track on Swift's seventh album Lover, in which she sings about abandoning her cloaks, and how one has to "step into the daylight and let it go".

Production 

The cinematography was handled by Rodrigo Prieto, who worked on the "Cardigan" video as well. Swift did not reveal to Prieto or the technical crew that the video was for a new album or song, so the video was shot without using the song. The shooting took place under strict COVID-19 pandemic safety measures, including testing protocols, as advised by Directors Guild of America, Screen Actors Guild and International Cinematographers Guild. The entire crew, including Swift and Lee, had their masks on; the pair took off their masks only during action. The dancers in the scene depicting witchcraft had their masks on while performing, thus their faces are not visible in the video. A color-coded system was used to signify which crew member could be close to the set and the actors; anybody in immediate vicinity of a scene had to wear a red wristband. Face shields were used whenever Swift or any cast was approached. The video was shot without a camera operator, using a crane-directed remote camera.

The pre-production phase was a back-and-forth interactive process between Swift, Prieto and other technicians. Swift wanted the video to conclude back in the cabin (as with "Cardigan") and that her lover, Lee, would be inside when she returns. Upon further discussion with Prieto and team, it was decided that both Swift and Lee would leave the cabin at the end. Swift initially developed the idea for the video as set at night, but then decided it would occur during the daytime. For the witchcraft scene, Swift did not want to use a real bonfire due to the 2020 California wildfires. Instead, she conceived of using magical orbs.

Ethan Tobman, the production designer, presented Swift with reference images and ideas for the sets, and one of them was having magenta leaves on the ground, which the singer liked. Tobman also suggested the idea for the autumnal forest. He worked with his art director, Simon Morgan, over Zoom. For the bonfire scene, Morgan and Prieto, gaffer Manny Tapia and key grip Donald Reynolds, sound-staged first and taped the space in the center where the magic orbs would be. The distance was measured to the blue screen background, and taped the spots of the trees, and mapped the lighting for the set of the carnival scene.

Awards and nominations
"Willow" was nominated for a Nashville Songwriters Award in 2021, for the category "Ten Songs I Wish I'd Written", while the music video was nominated for an Association of Independent Commercial Producers (AICP) award in the editorial category. At the 2021 Meus Prêmios Nick, "Willow" received a nomination for Video of the Year. At the 2021 MTV Video Music Awards, "Willow" received three nominations for Best Pop, Best Direction, and Best Art Direction, while Swift received a nod for Artist of the Year.

Live performances 

Swift performed "Willow" for the first time at the 63rd Annual Grammy Awards as part of a medley with "Cardigan" and "August", in a "dreamy" cottagecore setting featuring a moss-covered cabin in a forest, accompanied by collaborators Dessner and Jack Antonoff. The singer won Album of the Year for Folklore at the ceremony. Pitchfork critic Cat Zhang praised the performance as one of the show's best moments. Zhang lauded Swift's vocals and the enchanted forest-themed spectacle of the set, describing her look as a "benevolent fairy princess in a kingdom of dwarves". The Washington Post ranked Swift's performance as the sixth best of the evening, and highlighted its "woodsy, mystical aesthetic" aligning with that of Folklore, with "haunted-looking trees and glittering gold lights in the background". Billboard writer Heran Mamo ranked the "Lord of the Rings-meets-Twilight fantasy" performance as the fourth best of the show. Music journalist Rob Sheffield ranked Swift's performance as the first of the "10 Reasons We Loved the 2021 Grammys." Rolling Stone listed it as one of the top-five greatest Grammy performances of all time.

Swift included "Willow" on the set list of the Eras Tour (2023).

Track listing

Digital download and streaming
 "Willow"  – 3:34
Digital download and streaming (dancing witch version — Elvira Remix)
 "Willow"   – 3:04
Digital download and streaming (lonely witch version)
 "Willow"   – 3:34
Digital download and streaming (moonlit witch version)
 "Willow"   – 3:29
Digital download and streaming – Willow (the witch collection) – EP
 "Willow"  – 3:34
 "Willow"   – 3:04
 "Willow"   – 3:34
 "Willow"   – 3:28
 "Willow"   – 4:12
 "Willow"   – 3:40

Digital download and streaming (dancing witch version — Elvira remix, web store exclusive)
 "Willow" 
 "Willow" 
Digital download and streaming (lonely witch version, web store exclusive)
 "Willow" 
 "Willow" 
Digital download and streaming (moonlit witch version, web store exclusive)
 "Willow" 
 "Christmas Tree Farm" 
Digital download and streaming (90's trend remix)
 "Willow"  – 3:45

Credits and personnel
Credits adapted from YouTube.

Song

 Taylor Swift – vocals, songwriter
 Aaron Dessner – producer, songwriter, vocal recorder, drum machine programmer, percussion, keyboards, synthesizers, piano, electric guitar, bass guitar, acoustic guitar
 Jonathan Low – vocal recorder, mixer
 Bryce Dessner – orchestrator
 Greg Calbi – masterer
 Steve Fallone – masterer
 James McAlister – synthesizers, drum machine programmer
 Bryan Devendorf – percussion, drum machine programmer
 Yuki Numata Resnick – violin
 Josh Kaufman – electric guitar
 Clarice Jensen – cello
 Jason Treuting – glockenspiel
 Alex Soop – flute
 CJ Camerieri – French horn
 Thomas Bartlett – keyboard, synthesizers
 Benjamin Lanz – modular synth

Video

 Taylor Swift – director
 Rodrigo Prieto – director of photography
 Jil Hardin – producer
 Chancler Haynes – editor
 Ethan Tobman – production designer
 Regina Fernandez – production designer
 Joseph Cassell – stylist
 Sunshine Madsen – stylist
 Joe Osborne – first assistant director
 EV Salomon – co-first assistant director
 Ingenuity Studios – visual effects
 Grant Miller – visual effects
 David Lebensfeld – visual effects
 Jumanah Shaheen – visual effects
 Rebecca Skinner – executive producer
 Kathy Palmer – co-producer
 Manny Tapia – gaffer
 Alexander Griffiths – key grip
 Vincent Lucido – storyboarder

Charts

Weekly charts

Year-end charts

Certifications

Release history

See also 
 List of Billboard Adult Top 40 number-one songs of the 2020s
 List of Billboard Digital Song Sales number ones of 2020
 List of Billboard Hot 100 number-one singles of the 2020s
 List of Billboard Hot 100 number ones of 2020
 List of Billboard Hot 100 top-ten singles in 2020
 List of Canadian Hot 100 number-one singles of 2020
 List of number-one digital songs of 2020 (Canada)
 List of number-one singles of 2020 (Australia)
 List of number-one songs of 2020 (Singapore)
 List of top 10 singles in 2020 (Australia)
 List of top 10 singles in 2020 (Ireland)
 List of UK top-ten singles in 2020

Footnotes

References

Footnote

Citations

2020 singles
2020 songs
American folk songs
Billboard Hot 100 number-one singles
Canadian Hot 100 number-one singles
Music videos directed by Taylor Swift
Number-one singles in Australia
Number-one singles in Singapore
Republic Records singles
Songs about trees
Songs written by Aaron Dessner
Songs written by Taylor Swift
Song recordings produced by Aaron Dessner
Taylor Swift songs